Mount Bris is a broad ice-covered mountain with precipitous and partly ice-free slopes except to the southeast, the summit of Korten Ridge on Davis Coast in Graham Land, Antarctica. It is linked to Tsarevets Buttress and Detroit Plateau by Podvis Col to the southeast, and surmounting Sabine Glacier to the northeast, Temple Glacier to the southwest, and Kasabova Glacier to the northwest.

The peak was named by the UK Antarctic Place-Names Committee for Jean-Marie Le Bris, French naval officer who designed a glider and became the first glider pilot.

Map
 Trinity Peninsula. Scale 1:250000 topographic map No. 5697. Institut für Angewandte Geodäsie and British Antarctic Survey, 1996.

References
 Mount Bris. SCAR Composite Antarctic Gazetteer.
 

Mountains of Graham Land
Davis Coast